Whispers in the Dark is a song by Australian pop group Indecent Obsession. It was released as their third single from their second studio album of the Indio (1992). The song was released in September 1992 and peaked at number 7 in France. This was their highest-charting single in that country.

Track listing
 CD Single (France) (MCD 30848)
 "Whispers In The Dark" - 4:03
 "Cry For Freedom" - 5:12

 CD Single (Austria) (MCD 30077)
 "Whispers In The Dark" - 4:03
 "One Woman Man" - 4:23
 "Cry For Freedom" - 5:12

 CD Maxi (Germany) (MCD 31552)
 "Whispers In The Dark"	- 4:44
 "One Bad Dream" (Acoustic)	- 4:10
 "All Fall Down" (Acoustic) - 6:13

Chart performance

References

External links
 "Whispers in the Dark" by Indecent Obsession

1992 songs
1992 singles
Indecent Obsession songs
MCA Records singles
Pop ballads